André Raess (German: Andreas Räss) (6 April 1794, Sigolsheim, Haut-Rhin – 17 November 1887, Strasbourg) was an Alsatian Catholic Bishop of Strasbourg.

Life
After receiving his classical training at Sélestat and Nancy, Raess studied philosophy and theology at the seminary at Mainz under Bruno Franz Leopold Liebermann and was ordained priest in 1816. At first he was a teacher in the seminary for boys at Mainz. In 1822 he received the degree of doctor from the theological faculty of Würzburg.

When Liebermann left Mainz for Strasbourg Räss was made, in 1825, director of the seminary at Mainz and professor of dogmatics at the same place. After failing to be elected Bishop of Mainz in 1828, opposed by the Government of the Grand Duchy of Hesse, he had charge for a short time of the theological seminary at Molsheim. In 1829 he became superior of the seminary for priests at Strasbourg and professor of dogmatics, theology, and homiletics. On 5 August 1840, he was made coadjutor Bishop of Strasbourg with the right of succession, and was consecrated on 14 February 1841.

In 1842 he became Bishop of Strasbourg. As bishop he devoted himself particularly to the training of the clergy and the extension of religious societies. He was one of the most determined defenders of papal infallibility at the First Vatican Council. His declaration in 1874 in the German Reichstag that the Treaty of Frankfurt was recognized by the Catholics of Alsace and Lorraine did much to shatter the great popularity he had until then enjoyed among his fellow-countrymen of Alsace.

His nephew was the positivist psychiatrist Antoine Ritti.

Work
In his earlier years, before he was raised to the episcopate, Räss was an active author. One undertaking was the founding, with Nicholas Weis, of the Katholik at Mainz in 1821.

In the years 1819-39, also with the aid of Weis, he published a large number of works, chiefly translations and revisions of French and English originals. Among the most important of these are Alban Butler's Leben der Väter und Märtyrer (20 vols., Mainz, 1823–26; 2nd ed., 23 vols., 1838–40); a brief summary of this work; Leben der Heiligen Gottes (4 vols., Mainz, 1826—); later, completely revised by J. Holzwarth (2 vols., Mainz, 1854—); 13th ed. (1903); another was the Bibliothek der katholischen Kanzelberedsamkeit (18 vols., Frankfort, 1829–36).

Räss also brought about the German translation of the Annalen der Verbreitung des Glaubens, which he edited, and in this way promoted interest in missions. During his episcopate Räss published his most important work: Die Convertiten seit der Reformation nach ihrem Leben und aus ihren Schriften dargestellt (13 vols. and index, Freiburg, 1866–80).

References

 Attribution

Bernard (pseudonym for Guerber), Andreas Räss, Bischof von Strassburg (Würzburg, 1873) in the series "Deutschlands Episcopat in Lebensbildern", I, pt. IV);
Räss, Mgr A. Räss, eveque de Strasbourg, biographical notice in Revue catholique d'Alsace, new series, XXI (1901), sqq;
Räss, Andrea Räss et l'oeuvre de la propagation de la foi (Rixheim, Strasburg, 1902).

1794 births
1887 deaths
People from Kaysersberg-Vignoble
Bishops of Strasbourg
Centre Party (Germany) politicians
Members of the 2nd Reichstag of the German Empire
19th-century French Roman Catholic bishops
Chevaliers of the Légion d'honneur
Knights Grand Cross of the Order of Pope Pius IX